Euphonicmontage is the ninth studio album by Echo Orbiter.  It was released on Looking Glass Workshop in 2010.  The album has been described as “an innovative landmark in the world of indie rock.”  With an experimental nature mixing a range of influences from writer Ayn Rand to The Flaming Lips, Euphonicmontage was recorded to reflect the same Cubist style of Picasso’s paintings in musical form.  The highly artistic endeavor demonstrated that Echo Orbiter "are serious about their art and it shows on their latest release, Euphonicmontage."

Track listing

Credits
Justin Emerle - guitar, vocals, keyboards
Colin Emerle - bass guitar

References

External links
Euphonicmontage

2010 albums
Echo Orbiter albums